Saint Luke's College of Nursing and Health Sciences is a health sciences-focused college of Rockhurst University with its main campus in Kansas City, Missouri. It was formerly a private college associated with Saint Luke's Health System.  It enrolls over 550 undergraduate students and 125 graduate students every year. The college offers associate degrees, bachelor's degrees, master's degrees, doctoral degrees, and certificates in nursing and health sciences.

History
The hospital that would later become Saint Luke's Hospital of Kansas City first began as All Saints Hospital in 1885 at the intersection of 10th and Campbell Streets. In 1887, the hospital began offering a training program for nurses at the hospital. In 1903, the School of Nursing was officially established as a three-year diploma program under Eleanor Kelly as a department of Saint Luke’s Hospital of Kansas City (the successor to All Saints Hospital). Three students enrolled in the first year of operation, and the school had its first graduate, Virginia Pate, in 1906.  The hospital relocated to 44th and Mill Street in 1920 and built a nurses’ residence on campus. The college further expanded in 1946 when a four-story building was constructed, containing laboratories, classrooms, a library, offices, and residences for the approximately 200 nursing students at the time. The library was relocated to the Helen F. Spencer Center for Education in 1972. Beginning in 1985, the faculty of Saint Luke’s Hospital  School of Nursing conducted a study of the future needs of nurses and decided to switch from a diploma-based program to a baccalaureate-based program, admitting their first Bachelor of Science in Nursing students in 1991. The final diploma class graduated in 1992 (with the school having educated over 3,047 diploma students since its creation).

The College Board adopted a new master plan in 2010, renaming the college Saint Luke’s College of Health Sciences and beginning a journey to grow the school and become a financially independent, private, not-for-profit corporation (with Saint Luke’s Hospital of Kansas City being the single shareholder). The school moved to the 624 Westport Road location in 2011. In 2012, the college began offering graduate programs, initially offering a Master of Science in Nursing in Adult-Gerontology Acute Care Nurse Practitioner and Nurse Education, achieving full accreditation in 2015.

In 2018, the Higher Learning Commission approved a student body change, allowing Saint Luke’s College of Health Sciences to now offer the Associate of Science in Allied Health and Medical Assisting as well as the Associate of Arts degree in Allied Health. These new program offerings expanded the breadth of offerings to now allow first-time freshmen into the college, offering a General Education Core that focuses on multiculturalism and the health sciences professions.

Saint Luke's College of Health Sciences and Rockhurst University merged in 2020 to form Saint Luke's College of Nursing and Health Sciences at Rockhurst University. In June 2022, the college relocated from the Westport Road location to Sedgwick Hall on the main Rockhurst University campus.

References

External links
Official website

Educational institutions established in 1887
Nursing schools in Missouri
Universities and colleges in Kansas City, Missouri
1887 establishments in Missouri
Private universities and colleges in Missouri